The Loyumba Shinyen, also termed as the Loyamba Sinyen, is an 11th-12th century written constitution, regulated in the Manipur kingdom during the regime of King Loyumba (1074 AD-1112 AD). A promulgation of the proto-constitution in 429 AD by King Naophangba was reduced to a final format in 1100 AD. Historically, it is the first written constitution, and one of the well recorded antique manuscripts of the kingdom. Its Constitutionalism was replaced by the Manipur State Constitution Act, 1947, that was functional until Manipur was merged into India on October 15, 1949.

It includes the accounts of the distribution of the duties to the subjects of the king. Its rules and regulations remains to be an authoritative work in the Meitei social system till the present day Manipur.

Religious duties 
The following is the list of Meitei families who were given the duties of serving particular pantheons of gods and goddesses of the ancient Meitei religion.

Related pages 
 Cyrus the Great
 Hammurabi

References 

Meitei culture
History of Manipur
Constitutions